Andronovka is the name of several rural localities in Russia:
Andronovka, Perm Krai, a village in Vereshchaginsky District of Perm Krai
Andronovka, Ryazan Oblast, a village in Kazache-Dyukovsky Rural Okrug of Shatsky District in Ryazan Oblast